The Scottish Rugby Academy provides Scotland's up and coming rugby stars a dedicated focused routeway for development into the professional game. Entry is restricted to Scottish qualified students and both male and female entrants are accepted into 4 regional academies. The 2017–18 season sees the third year of the academy.

Season overview

This was the third year of the Scottish Rugby Academy. 11 players were signed from the academy into full-time professional clubs from last season's Stage 3.

This year sees 8 new entrants into the academy going straight into Stage 3 - being assigned to a professional club. In addition, another 9 players have been promoted to Stage 3 from Stage 2.

A second intake of players into this year's academy at Stage 1 and 2 will be announced after July and August after the regional age-grade series ends.

Regional Academies

The Scottish Rugby Academy runs four regional academies in Scotland:-

 Glasgow and the West
 Borders and East Lothian
 Edinburgh
 Caledonia

These geographically roughly correspond to the traditional districts of Glasgow District, South, Edinburgh District and North and Midlands.

Players and stages

Players are selected in three stages:-

 Stage 1 - Regionally selected and regionally supported players
 Stage 2 - Nationally selected and regionally supported players 
 Stage 3 - Nationally selected and regionally supported players assigned to a professional team.

Stage 3 players

Stage 3 players are assigned to a professional team.

Nominally, for the men, Glasgow Warriors receive the Stage 3 players of Glasgow and the West and Caledonia regions, while Edinburgh Rugby receive the Stage 3 players of the Edinburgh and Borders and East Lothian regions.

The women are integrated into the Scotland women's national rugby sevens team and the Scotland women's national rugby union team.

Borders and East Lothian

Caledonia

Note: these players, originally noted as Caledonia regional academy Stage 3 players were later formally assigned to the Glasgow regional academy when the Scottish Rugby Academy completed their second academy intake of the season.

Edinburgh

Duncan Ferguson, Chloe Rollie, Lisa Thomson and Sarah Law were added to the Edinburgh Stage 3 academy squad in the Scottish Rugby Academy's second intake in the 2017–18 season.

Glasgow and the West

Dan York was added to the Glasgow Stage 3 academy squad in the Scottish Rugby Academy's second intake in the 2017–18 season.

Stage 1 and 2 players

The inductees for the 2017–18 season are split into their regional academies.

Borders and East Lothian

Adam Hall was transferred to the Edinburgh regional academy in the second intake.

 Patrick Anderson Stage 1/2 Melrose RFC
 Thomas Brown Stage 1/2 Melrose RFC
 Kyle Brunton Stage 1/2 Hawick RFC
 Rory Darge Stage 1/2 North Berwick RFC
 Anna Forsyth Stage 1/2 Gala Vixens
 Roan Frostwick Stage 1/2 North Berwick RFC
 Adam Hall Stage 1/2 Melrose RFC
 Lauren Harris Stage 1/2 Melrose Ladies
 Robbie McCallum Stage 1/2 Loretto School
 Finlay Scott Stage 1/2 Jed-Forest

New additions in the second intake:

 Thomas Jeffrey (Peebles)
 Matthew Kindness (Kelso)
 Scott King (Preston Lodge HS/RFC)
 William Owen (Melrose)
 Lana Skeldon (Watsonians)
 Gemma Stoddart (Watsonians)
 Mak Wilson (Duns)

Caledonia

Fergus Bradbury was on the initial list of Caledonia academy players but not on the second intake list. George Goodenough and Andrew McLean were transferred to the Edinburgh academy in the second intake. Grant Hughes was transferred to the Glasgow academy in the second intake. Cameron Henderson (Strathallan School) is added to the Caledonia list.

 Fergus Bradbury Stage 1/2 Stirling University
 Karen Dunbar Stage 1/2 RHC Cougars
 Angus Fraser Stage 1/2 High School of Dundee
 George Goodenough Stage 1/2 Strathallan School (Fly-half)
 Caitlan Harvey Stage 1/2 Caithness RFC (Wing)
 Grant Hughes Stage 1/2 Dollar Academy
 Megan Kennedy Stage 1/2 Stirling County (Prop)
 Andrew McLean Stage 1/2 Stirling County
 Lucy Park Stage 1/2 Murrayfield Wanderers RFC (Openside flanker)
 Logan Trotter Stage 1/2 Stirling County
 Emma Wassell Stage 1/2 Murrayfield Wanderers RFC (Lock)

New additions in the second intake:

 Jacob Henry (Highland/Dingwall Academy)
 Ollie Smith (Strathallan School)
 Murphy Walker (Strathallan School)

Edinburgh

Chloe Rollie, Lisa Thomson and Sarah Law were initially named as Stage 2 but were promoted to Stage 3 in the second intake. They are now listed with the Stage 3 players. Charlie Jupp (unattached) and James Miller (Watsonians) are added to the Edinburgh list.

 Callum Atkinson Stage 1/2 Boroughmuir
 Shaun Gunn Stage 1/2 Edinburgh Academicals
 Fin Hobbis Stage 1/2 Stewarts Melville
 Jamie Hodgson Stage 1/2 Stewarts Melville
 Nicola Howat Stage 1/2 Edinburgh University RFC
 Rhona Lloyd Stage 1/2 Edinburgh University
 Lisa Martin Stage 1/2 Murrayfield Wanderers RFC
 Helen Nelson Stage 1/2 Murrayfield Wanderers RFC
 Dean Roger Stage 1/2 Edinburgh Academicals
 Eilidh Sinclair Stage 1/2 Murrayfield Wanderers RFC (Wing)

New additions in the second intake:

 Jack Blain (Stewart's Melville College)
 Connor Boyle (Stewart's Melville College)
 Jamie Dobie (Merchiston Castle School)
 Dan Gamble (Merchiston Castle School)

Glasgow and the West

Dan York was initially named as Stage 2 but was promoted to Stage 3 in the second intake. He is now listed with the Stage 3 players.

 Scott Bell Stage 1/2 Glasgow Hawks
 Paul Cairncross Stage 1/2 East Kilbride RFC (Hooker)
 Ross Jackson Stage 1/2 Biggar RFC
 Andrew Jardine Stage 1/2 Biggar RFC
 Guy Kelly Stage 1/2 Biggar RFC
 Mhairi McDonald Stage 1/2 Hillhead Jordanhill RFC
 Louise McMillan Stage 1/2 Hillhead Jordanhill RFC
 Andrew Nimmo Stage 1/2 Biggar RFC
 Craig Pringle Stage 1/2 Stirling County
 Kirsty Reid Stage 1/2 Hillhead Jordanhill 
 Bruce Sorbie Stage 1/2 Stirling County
 Gavin Wilson Stage 1/2 Dumfries Saints

New additions in the second intake:

 Scott Clelland (Prestwick Academy/Ayr)
 Paddy Dewhurst (Ayr)
 Murray Godsman (High School of Glasgow/Glasgow Hawks)
 Rory Jackson (Kelvinside Academy)
 Luhann Kotze (Biggar HS/RFC)
 Ross Thompson (Glasgow Hawks)

Graduates of this year 

Players who have signed professional contracts with clubs:

  Matt Fagerson to  Glasgow Warriors
  Robert Beattie to  Glasgow Warriors
  Robbie Nairn to  Glasgow Warriors
  Adam Nicol to  Glasgow Warriors
  Bruce Flockhart to  Glasgow Warriors
  Josh Henderson to  Scotland 7s
  Ross McCann to  Scotland 7s
  Jason Baggott to  Edinburgh
  Luke Crosbie to  Edinburgh
  Archie Erskine to  Edinburgh
  Cameron Fenton to  Edinburgh
  Charlie Shiel to  Edinburgh
  George Taylor to  Edinburgh

References

2017-18
2017–18 in Scottish rugby union